The Internationale Festival der Filmhochschulen München also known as Filmschoolfest Munich is one of the most important festivals for young filmmakers in the world. More than 3,500 films were screened at the festival so far. The next festival will be from November 15–21, 2020. 

The festival was established by Professor Wolfgang Längsfeld  in 1981. It is held annually by the "Internationale Münchner Filmwochen GmbH", which is also responsible for Filmfest München each summer. Festival director is Diana Iljine (since 2011).

Filmschools from all over the world can submit student short films. The submissions are evaluated by an expert jury. All chosen films are shown during the festival - each year approximately 100 foreign students and professors have the opportunity to meet, enter into discussions and share their experiences with each other. The students are competing for several awards during the festival. An independent jury under the lead of a jury president choose the winning films. Among the jury presidents have been filmmakers such as Götz Otto, Philip Gröning, Marco Kreuzpaintner, Sebastian Schipper, Hans Steinbichler, Michael Ballhaus, Roland Emmerich, Wim Wenders und Bernd Eichinger.

Several well-known filmmakers were once participants of Filmschoolfest Munich - such aus Lars von Trier, Thomas Vinterberg, Oscar-Winner Nick Park, Caroline Link, Jan Sverak, Florian Gallenberger, Sönke Wortmann, Marcus H. Rosenmüller, Rainer Kaufmann, Maren Ade and Detlev Buck.

References

External links 
Filmschoolfest Munich
FILMFEST MÜNCHEN, Internationale Münchner Filmwochen GmbH

Film festivals in Germany
Festivals established in 1981
Festivals in Munich